Carl Martin Nelson (November 12, 1892 – February 28, 1962) was a member of the Wisconsin State Assembly.

Biography
Nelson was born on November 12, 1892, in Deer Creek, Taylor County, Wisconsin. He attended Southern Minnesota Normal College. During World War I, he served with the United States Marine Corps in France and Belgium. He died in Wisconsin on February 28, 1962.

Political career
Nelson was a member of the Assembly from 1935 to 1946. Additionally, he was chairman of Deer Creek and of Taylor County, Wisconsin. He was a Republican.

References

1892 births
1962 deaths
People from Taylor County, Wisconsin
Republican Party members of the Wisconsin State Assembly
Military personnel from Wisconsin
United States Marines
United States Marine Corps personnel of World War I
20th-century American politicians